Votorantim is a city located at the southwest of São Paulo State in Brazil. It is part of the Metropolitan Region of Sorocaba. The population is 123,599 (2020 est.).

Geography
The city has a tropical weather and annual average temperature is 20 degrees. It makes borders with the cities of Sorocaba, Piedade, Ibiúna, Salto de Pirapora and Alumínio. It has important access ways to highways such as Castello Branco (SP-280), Raposo Tavares (SP-270), João Leme dos Santos (SP-264) and SP-79 which binds the city to the south coast of the State.

See also
 Cantate FM, radio station

References

External links
  Votorantim Official Website

Municipalities in São Paulo (state)